Marston Moor was a 52-gun third rate  frigate built for the navy of the Commonwealth of England at Blackwall Yard, and launched in 1654.

After the Restoration in 1660, she was renamed HMS York. By 1677 her armament had been increased to 60 guns. York was wrecked in 1703.

Notes

References

Lavery, Brian (2003) The Ship of the Line - Volume 1: The development of the battlefleet 1650–1850. Conway Maritime Press. .

Ships of the line of the Royal Navy
1650s ships
Ships built by the Blackwall Yard
Maritime incidents in 1703
Speaker-class ships of the line